Chess at the 2017 ASEAN Para Games was held at Malaysian International Trade & Exhibition Centre, Kuala Lumpur.

Medal tally

Medalists

Men

Women

External links
 Chess Games Result system

2017 ASEAN Para Games
Chess at the ASEAN Para Games
ASEAN Para Games